The Hundred of Kondoparinga is a cadastral unit of hundred in South Australia. It is one of the eleven hundreds of the County of Hindmarsh .

The District Council of Kondoparinga was established in 1853, bringing local government to the hundred as well as parts of the westerly adjacent Hundred of Kuitpo. The Kondoparinga council was abolished in 1935 by amalgamation with Echunga, Clarendon and Macclesfield councils into the new District Council of Meadows.

Etymology
The name Kondoparinga was once thought to be a Kaurna word meaning "long winding water, breeding crawfish, between steep banks" but contemporary linguists are highly doubtful and suggest a more literal meaning of "chest river place" based on kondo meaning "chest", pari meaning "river" and the locative suffix ngga.

Localities
The Hundred of Kondoparinga includes the following localities:
 Ashbourne
 Bull Creek
 parts of Finniss
 McHarg Creek
 Meadows
 Mount Magnificent
 Mount Observation
 Nangkita
 Paris Creek
 Prospect Hill
 Sandergrove
 parts of Strathalbyn

See also
 Lands administrative divisions of South Australia

References

Kondoparinga